Skylab & Tragtenberg, Vol. 2 is a collaborative album between Brazilian musicians Rogério Skylab and Lívio Tragtenberg. The second installment of a trilogy, it was self-released on December 20, 2016, and is available for digital download/streaming from digital retailers, as well as Skylab's official website.

"As Horas pela Alameda" is a poem by Fernando Pessoa set to music.

Track listing

Personnel
 Rogério Skylab – vocals, production
 Lívio Tragtenberg – bass clarinet, toy ukulele, programming, mixing, arrangements
 Thiago Martins – electric guitar, classical guitar
 Daniel Nakamura – mastering
 Carlos Mancuso – cover art

References

2016 albums
Collaborative albums
Rogério Skylab albums
Self-released albums
Sequel albums
Obscenity controversies in music
Albums free for download by copyright owner